Albanian Ajax School is a sports academy located in Shkodër, Albania. The club's most notable team is their women's team who compete in the Women's National Championship. The club has a partnership with Dutch giants Ajax FC.

References 

Football clubs in Albania
Association football clubs established in 2012
2012 establishments in Albania
Women's football clubs in Albania